

The following lists events that happened during 1985 in Afghanistan.

Afghanistan is locked in military stalemate throughout the year, with neither the Muslim insurgents nor the Soviet-backed government troops mounting any decisive military offensive, though there are numerous operations and clashes. The insurgents appear better equipped than previously, with antiaircraft weapons in particular, in their efforts to counter government forces, who are aided by an estimated 115,000 Soviet soldiers. Afghanistan remains completely dependent on Moscow.

Incumbents
 General Secretary of the People's Democratic Party of Afghanistan: Babrak Karmal
 Chairman of the Revolutionary Council:  Babrak Karmal
 Chairman of the Council of Ministers: Sultan Ali Keshtmand

1985
Afghanistan produces 31% of the world's opium, according to the UN Office for Drug Control and Crime Prevention.

January 1985
Soviet-Afghan troops launch an offensive in the provinces of Konarha, Nangarhar, and Paktia in eastern Afghanistan and Nimruz and Herat in the west, part of a move designed to cut off guerrilla supply routes.

January 10, 1985
PADA general secretary Karmal announces that membership of the ruling Communist Party has increased from 16,000 at the time it came to power to 120,000. On the same day, Afghanistan marks the 20th anniversary of the party's founding.

March 1985
A UN report on human rights in Afghanistan accuses Soviet forces of "bombarding villages, destroying food supplies, massacring civilians, and disregarding the Geneva convention." The report claims that the government is holding 50,000 political prisoners and that tortures in jails are "commonplace." The government rejects the claims as "fabrication."

March 23, 1985
According to resistance sources in Pakistan, some 400 Soviet and Afghan troops are killed when a series of chain-reaction explosions triggered by a time bomb engulfs a military convoy at Ollamd, near the Salang tunnel.

April 1985
Western diplomats claim that several hundred civilians have been killed in late March during Soviet-Afghan attacks in the provinces of Laghman in the east, Qonduz and Samangan in the north, and Herat.

April 23–25, 1985
A three-day Loya Jirga (grand council) is attended by 1,796 delegates. This traditional national tribal assembly had not been convened since the 1979 coup.

May 1985
Pressure from the Pakistanis, from outside supporters, and from the guerrilla commanders force the seven major resistance groups based in Peshawar to form an alliance. Inside Afghanistan, neighbouring ethnolinguistically oriented resistance groups unite for military and political purposes within their various regions. Internal struggles for leadership also occur in certain areas where the Soviets have little influence, such as Hazarajat and Nurestan. Although no national liberation front exists, the resistance groups begin to feel that they are part of an overall effort to liberate Afghanistan.

June 12, 1985
At least 20 Afghan Air Force planes are blown up at Shindand air base in the western province of Farah.

June, August, and December 1985
The UN special representative for Afghanistan, Cordovez, shuttles between separate rooms in the UN building in Geneva, meeting alternately with Afghan Foreign Minister Dost and his Pakistani counterpart, Khan. The foreign ministers do not meet directly, since to do so would amount to recognition by Pakistan of Karmal's regime. Iran once again boycotts the talks but is kept informed. The last round of talks adjourns on December 19 to allow the parties to study new UN proposals. Earlier, the U.S. announced its willingness to act as guarantor of a settlement that would involve Soviet troop withdrawal and an end to U.S. aid to the guerrillas.

August 1985
Foreign Minister Dost visits India, the only country outside the Soviet bloc with which relations improve during the year.

Mid-August 1985
An anti-guerrilla onslaught is launched by the joint Soviet-Afghan military command in eastern Afghanistan but falls far short of success. However, the offensive, described by area experts as among the biggest since the Soviet intervention in 1979, brings the war closer to the Pakistani border, a fact that worries Islamabad.

September 4, 1985
An Afghan airliner traveling from Kabul to Farah crashes near Kandahar, killing all 52 people on board. The government blames the guerrillas for the incident.

 
Afghanistan
Years of the 20th century in Afghanistan
Afghanistan
1980s in Afghanistan